Frasson is a surname. Notable people with this surname include:

 Joe Frasson (1935–2016), American NASCAR Winston Cup Series driver
 Vinicius Frasson (born 1984), Italian Brazilian footballer